Jarno Henrik Kärki (born October 13, 1994) is a Finnish professional ice hockey forward currently under contract with ZSC Lions of the National League (NL).

Kärki made his Liiga debut playing with Ässät during the 2014–15 Liiga season.

References

External links

1994 births
Living people
Ässät players
EHC Biel players
Färjestad BK players
Finnish ice hockey forwards
GCK Lions players
Linköping HC players
Sportspeople from Pori
Tappara players
ZSC Lions players